The Ordnance BL 12-inch howitzer was a scaled-up version of the successful BL 9.2-inch siege howitzer.

History
Following the success of their BL 9.2-inch howitzer, Vickers designed an almost identical version scaled up to a calibre of 12 inches, the Mk II entering service on the Western Front in August 1916. Eight complete equipments are reported as arriving in August 1916 and being in action in France shortly afterwards.

It was similar but unrelated to the BL 12 inch railway howitzers Mk I, III and V produced by the Elswick Ordnance Company at the same time.

The Mk IV was a more powerful version with longer barrel produced from 1917.

Later models were used for British home defence in World War II.

Service use

As with other large-calibre weapons, it was operated by the Royal Garrison Artillery in World War I.

The 12-inch was dismantled and transported in six loads mounted on traction engine wheels. It was then reassembled on its static siege mounting on top of a steel holdfast, with 22 tons of earth in a box sitting on the front of the holdfast in front of the gun, to counteract the kick of firing.

Ammunition

See also
List of siege artillery

Weapons of comparable role, performance and era
305 mm howitzer M1915 Russian equivalent
Skoda 305 mm Model 1911 Austro-Hungarian equivalent

Notes

References

Bibliography
 Dale Clarke, British Artillery 1914-1919. Heavy Artillery. Osprey Publishing, Oxford UK, 2005 
 I.V. Hogg & L.F. Thurston, British Artillery Weapons & Ammunition 1914-1918. London: Ian Allan, 1972.

External links

Newsreel showing 12" siege howitzers and other heavy weapons in action

World War I artillery of the United Kingdom
World War I howitzers
Siege artillery
World War II artillery of the United Kingdom
305 mm artillery
Vickers